Odsal Boomerangs were a motorcycle speedway team based at Odsal Stadium, Rooley Lane, Odsal, Bradford, West Yorkshire, from 1945 to 1950. The team became the Odsal Tudors during the 1950 season.

History
During 1939, Bradford Northern Rugby league club's Harry Hornby and the local MP H Hepworth investigated the possibility of introducing speedway racing in Odsal, but the outbreak of World War II put an end to their plans. In 1945, with victory in Europe within sight, Harry Hornby joined together with the man who always claimed to have invented the sport, Johnnie S Hoskins, to reactive the plans. On 23 June 1945 before a crowd of over 20,000 the Lord Mayor, Alderman Cecil Barnett, officially opened the track.

The first season was a series of open and challenge meetings, as speedway, along with other professional sports, recovered from the war years. In 1946 league racing was introduced and Odsal joined the six strong National League, the highest league, which apart from Belle Vue consisted of London-based tracks. All tracks, with the exception of Odsal, had staged speedway in the pre-war years. Odsal featured on 2 April 1946 in the first post war league meeting, when they won 45-39 at Wimbledon.

The teams' nickname was 'Boomerangs', a name giving the nod to the sports Australian roots. The first season was marred when on 6 July 1946, a crowd of 34,0000 at Odsal Stadium witnessed the Boomerangs lose to Belle Vue Aces. During the match promising Huddersfield born junior Albert 'Aussie' Rosenfeld, son of Albert Rosenfeld hit the fence and was taken to St Luke's Hospital, Bradford, with a suspected fractured skull. He died 10 days later, on 16 July 1946. This accident was followed a week later by a further crash which ended the career of the veteran rider Colin Watson. It resulted in the sports governing body, the Speedway Control Board, issuing an ultimatum that the Odsal track shape be changed or its licence would be withdrawn. This resulted in the square corners disappearing and a more typical oval shape emerging.

The post war period was a boom time for speedway, and other professional sports, as British sports starved fans flocked to stadiums throughout the county. Crowds of over 20,000 were regular at Odsal, the average in 1946 being 31,000, the high point was the 47,050 who saw England defeat Australia 65-43 on 5 July 1947, a figure that remains the highest crowd for a speedway meeting at Odsal.

At the end of the 1948 season, when Odsal finished bottom of the league, Johnnie Hoskins resigned, due he claimed to the increasing time demanded by his speedway interests in Scotland. Hoskins was replaced on the board of directors by Bruce Booth, Hornby’s nephew, and Eric Langton, the former Belle Vue rider who finished runner up in the first world championship in 1936.

The worst day in the history of Bradford speedway was on 1 July 1950 in the league match against the West Ham Hammers when the now 48-year-old veteran rider Joe Abbott fell in his second race and was hit by a following rider and was instantly killed. The riders and promoters decided to carry on with the meeting, as they believed Joe would have wished it. Fans left Odsal unaware that Joe, nicknamed the Ironman, had ridden his last race. On the same night Odsal's sister track, the Halifax Dukes, were riding at Norwich and the Dukes rider Jock Sheard, born in the same Burnley street as Abbott, crashed in his second race and was killed.

Sheet music exists for a song - Boom Boom Boomerangs - written especially for the speedway team.

Season summary

Notable riders
Joe Abbott
Ron Clarke
Max Grosskreutz
Oliver Hart
Bill Longley
Ernie Price
Alec Statham

See also
 Bradford Tudors
 Bradford Panthers
 Bradford Northern (speedway)
 Bradford Barons
 Bradford Dukes

References

Sport in Bradford
Defunct British speedway teams